Cameron Ling (born 27 February 1981) is a former Australian rules footballer who played for the Geelong Football Club in the Australian Football League (AFL).

He is now a commentator on AFL football for the Seven Network and a special comments commentator on AFL football for ABC Grandstand. He is also a member of the selection panel for the AFL All-Australian team and the AFL Rising Star Award.

Career
Ling played junior football for the Geelong Falcons  as a full-forward and was drafted by his hometown club, the Geelong Football Club. 

In 2007, his onfield performances were rewarded with selection in the All-Australian team on the interchange.

On 20 January 2010, Cameron Ling was announced as the team's new captain, taking over from the recently retired Tom Harley. He captained the Cats in the 2010 AFL season and the 2011 AFL season. In 2011, he captained Geelong to their third premiership in 5 years against Collingwood. He kicked the final goal of the match after a turn-over from Héritier Lumumba.

Shortly after guiding the Cats to their premiership win, Cameron Ling announced his retirement on 5 October 2011. Being able to nullify the opposition's best midfielder whilst managing to influence matches has made Cameron Ling regarded as one of the best ever taggers to play AFL. He was succeeded as captain by Joel Selwood.

Post playing days

In November 2011, Ling announced he would join Channel 7 in a commentary role on one of their Saturday night games, he also has commentated on Friday night matches. At the beginning of the 2012  Associated Public Schools of Victoria football season, Ling took up the position of Director of Football at Geelong Grammar School.

On 9 October 2013, Ling was appointed to work one day per week during the 2014 season on the development of the North Melbourne leadership group.

Ling is an Australian Apprenticeships Ambassador for the Australian Government.

"Mayor" of Geelong

In what started as a joke, following the hype of the Cats drought-breaking premiership, Cameron Ling was touted as the 'mayor of Geelong', a humorous reference to the way he is idolised by Geelong people.

On Wednesday 3 October 2007 though, Geelong's then Mayor, councillor Bruce Harwood, agreed that he'd be happy to step down for Ling. Ling's interest in politics and his intelligence is widely known, while it's been reported that he took a significant interest in local council and leadership during his days at St. Joseph's College, Geelong.

During the Premiership celebratory parade through Geelong's streets on 3 October, Ling acknowledged his title as mayor, however despite the contention it raised, was never formalised and thus more of a publicity stunt.

Personal life
In December 2012, Ling's partner Nicole Dodds gave birth to their first child.

Statistics

|- style="background-color: #EAEAEA"
! scope="row" style="text-align:center" | 2000
|style="text-align:center;"|
| 45 || 10 || 3 || 1 || 45 || 26 || 71 || 25 || 7 || 0.3 || 0.1 || 4.5 || 2.6 || 7.1 || 2.5 || 0.7
|-
! scope="row" style="text-align:center" | 2001
|style="text-align:center;"|
| 45 || 13 || 8 || 3 || 104 || 61 || 165 || 43 || 30 || 0.6 || 0.2 || 8.0 || 4.7 || 12.7 || 3.3 || 2.3
|- style="background-color: #EAEAEA"
! scope="row" style="text-align:center" | 2002
|style="text-align:center;"|
| 45 || 21 || 11 || 8 || 248 || 167 || 415 || 85 || 49 || 0.5 || 0.4 || 11.8 || 8.0 || 19.8 || 4.0 || 2.3
|-
! scope="row" style="text-align:center" | 2003
|style="text-align:center;"|
| 45 || 21 || 4 || 5 || 280 || 242 || 522 || 112 || 53 || 0.2 || 0.2 || 13.3 || 11.5 || 24.9 || 5.3 || 2.5
|- style="background-color: #EAEAEA"
! scope="row" style="text-align:center" | 2004
|style="text-align:center;"|
| 45 || 25 || 16 || 5 || 357 || 235 || 592 || 168 || 72 || 0.6 || 0.2 || 14.3 || 9.4 || 23.7 || 6.7 || 2.9
|-
! scope="row" style="text-align:center" | 2005
|style="text-align:center;"|
| 45 || 23 || 11 || 9 || 307 || 260 || 567 || 139 || 50 || 0.5 || 0.4 || 13.4 || 11.3 || 24.6 || 6.0 || 2.2
|- style="background-color: #EAEAEA"
! scope="row" style="text-align:center" | 2006
|style="text-align:center;"|
| 45 || 22 || 10 || 3 || 248 || 255 || 503 || 131 || 61 || 0.4 || 0.1 || 11.3 || 11.6 || 22.9 || 6.0 || 2.8
|-
! scope="row" style="text-align:center;" | 2007
|style="text-align:center;"|Geelong
| 45 || 24 || 28 || 6 || 215 || 261 || 476 || 107 || 69 || 1.2 || 0.2 || 9.0 || 10.9 || 19.8 || 4.5 || 2.9
|- style="background-color: #EAEAEA"
! scope="row" style="text-align:center" | 2008
|style="text-align:center;"|
| 45 || 23 || 15 || 5 || 237 || 309 || 546 || 106 || 79 || 0.6 || 0.2 || 10.3 || 13.4 || 23.7 || 4.6 || 3.4
|-
! scope="row" style="text-align:center;" | 2009
|style="text-align:center;"|
| 45 || 22 || 7 || 7 || 235 || 265 || 500 || 100 || 106 || 0.3 || 0.3 || 10.7 || 12.0 || 22.7 || 4.6 || 4.8
|- style="background-color: #EAEAEA"
! scope="row" style="text-align:center" | 2010
|style="text-align:center;"|
| 45 || 21 || 9 || 12 || 211 || 253 || 464 || 76 || 112 || 0.4 || 0.6 || 10.0 || 12.0 || 22.1 || 3.6 || 5.3
|-
! scope="row" style="text-align:center;" | 2011
|style="text-align:center;"|
| 45 || 21 || 17 || 9 || 265 || 192 || 457 || 74 || 92 || 0.8 || 0.4 || 12.6 || 9.1 || 21.8 || 3.5 || 4.4
|- class="sortbottom"
! colspan=3| Career
! 246
! 139
! 73
! 2752
! 2526
! 5278
! 1166
! 780
! 0.6
! 0.3
! 11.2
! 10.3
! 21.5
! 4.7
! 3.2
|}

Honours and achievements

Team
AFL Premiership (Geelong): 2007, 2009, 2011 (C)
McClelland Trophy (Geelong): 2007, 2008
NAB Cup (Geelong): 2006, 2009
Individual
All-Australian: 2007
Carji Greeves Medal: 2004
Australian representative honours in International rules football: 2002
Geelong F.C. Best First Year Reserves Player Award: 2000
Geelong F.C. Most Improved Player Award: 2001
Geelong F.C. Most club votes in Brownlow Medal: 2002, 2003, 2005
Geelong F.C. Community Champion Award: 2003
Geelong F.C. Most Determined and Most Dedicated Player Award: 2005
Geelong F.C Coach's Award: 2008
Captain of Geelong F.C.: 2010—2011
Vice-captain of Geelong F.C.: 2006—2009
Deputy vice-captain of Geelong F.C.: 2005
AFL Rising Star nomination: 2001
Vic Country representative honours at the AFL Under 18 Championships: 1998, 1999
Captain of Geelong Falcons (TAC Cup): 1998
TAC Cup Team of the Year: 1998
Australian (Under-17) representative honours in International rules football: 1998

References

External links

Geelong Football Club players
Geelong Football Club Premiership players
All-Australians (AFL)
Carji Greeves Medal winners
1981 births
Living people
Geelong Football Club captains
Australian rules footballers from Geelong
Geelong Falcons players
St Joseph's Football Club players
Australia international rules football team players
Three-time VFL/AFL Premiership players
Australian rules football commentators